Seiska or VII divisioona is the seventh level in the Finnish football league system. The number of teams that compete each season can vary. The VII divisioona was introduced in 1973 and in the mid-2000’s it became known as the Seiska (Number Seven in English and Sjuan in Swedish). In theory, Seiska is the last league in Finland where a club can go all the way and become Veikkausliiga champions.

Competition 
The clubs in the Seiska are divided in 2 groups decided by geographical location. During the course of a season (starting in April and ending in October) teams play each other once. The groups then split approximately in half and the clubs play another round of one match against each other. The top teams in each Seiska group are normally promoted to the Kutonen. 

In the past there were more divisions and in the 1980s there was a lower tier VIII divisioona level. In 2002 Seiska comprised 5  divisions with 64 teams affiliated to the SPL Helsingin piiri.

Notable clubs

Helsingin Palloseura
Helsingin Palloseura (HPS) won the Finnish football championship (Mestaruussarja) 9 times and they also played in the European Cup, against Stade de Reims in 1958–59. In 1999 they were forced to abandon their place in the Kakkonen and reformed in Section 1 of the Seiska for the 2000 season. In their first season they finished in ninth place in their section and spent two more seasons at this level before gaining promotion at the end of the 2002 campaign under player coach Harri Hiltunen.

Administration

District Football Associations
The Seiska is administered by one of the District Football Associations, the SPL Helsingin piiri.

Teams within the Seiska are eligible to compete in the Suomen Cup and the Suomen Regions' Cup. The clubs are normally listed in an abbreviated form and their full names can be viewed by referring to the List of clubs or the relevant District Association.

Current clubs - 2021 season

References

External links
Finnish FA
ResultCode

8